Quentin Cheng Jiun Ho (Chinese: 张骏和, born 20 November 1999) is a Malaysian professional footballer who plays as a right-back for Malaysia Super League side Selangor and the Malaysia national team.

Early life 
He was born to Malaysian Chinese parents in Sydney, Australia. His father, Ken, is from Johor, while his mother, Michelle, is from Perak.  The ancestral home of his family is Fujian, China. His father is a beloved mathematics teacher at Carlingford High School.

Club career

Northern Tigers 
Cheng started his football career with the Northern Tigers in his younger years.

Manly United FC 
He later moved on to Manly United FC in 2015 before signing with North Shore Mariners in 2016-17.

Central Coast Mariners 
From there, he was selected in the NYL program and made the shift to Central Coast Mariners in the back end of 2017.

Sutherland Sharks 
Following a year playing in the National Youth League, he caught the eye of scouts for Sutherland Sharks and played his 2019 season in Sutherland. This included a victory in the Grand Final of the PS4 U20's NPL 1 Competition. This caught the eye of recruiters in Malaysia, who were aware of his Malaysian heritage and invited him to the U23 Malaysia training camp to train with a squad. This process concluded in his selection for the 2019 Sea Games where he made his first appearance for the team and scored off the bench in the final group stage game.

Selangor
Selangor flagged their interest and signed him to their reserve team Selangor II for the 2020 season.

Loan to Penang
Before the 2021 season, he signed for Penang in the Malaysian top flight for a 1 season loan terms.

International
In 2019, Quentin received his first call-up for the Malaysia under-23 team after being named in the final 20-man squad for the 2019 Southeast Asian Games.

On 23 September 2021, Quentin received his first call-up to the senior national team, for central training and friendly matches against Jordan and Uzbekistan. He debuted for Malaysia in a friendly 4–0 loss to Jordan on 6 October 2021.

Honours
Selangor
 Malaysia Cup runner-up: 2022

References

External links
 

1999 births
Living people
Association football fullbacks
Malaysian footballers
Malaysia international footballers
Malaysia youth international footballers
Australian soccer players
Australian people of Malaysian descent
Australian sportspeople of Chinese descent
Malaysian sportspeople of Chinese descent
Penang F.C. players
Sutherland Sharks FC players
National Premier Leagues players
Malaysia Super League players
Competitors at the 2019 Southeast Asian Games
Competitors at the 2021 Southeast Asian Games
Southeast Asian Games competitors for Malaysia